The Western Railway Corridor is a term, used since , for a partly disused railway line running through the west of Ireland. Currently two sections of the line, from Limerick via Ennis to Athenry and from Collooney to Sligo, see regular services, with other sections either closed or only technically classed as open.

Context

West on Track
West on Track was established in 2003 with the aim of reopening the western rail corridor line, for the use of passenger and freight traffic. Its aim was to preserve the infrastructure already in place and to seek funding for the reopening of the railway line. People involved in West on Track include the sociologist Fr. Micheál MacGréil SJ.

Expert Working Group
In 2005 an Expert Working Group reported on the prospects for reopening all or part of the corridor. In September 2006 the preservation and reclamation from encroachment of the northern section began and the Government then announced funding to begin Phase 1 (Ennis-Athenry) of the re-opening of the corridor. The reopening of these sections was included in the Transport 21 infrastructural plan, and the National Development Plan 2007–2013 "Transforming Ireland – A Better Quality of Life for All". Transport 21 was the plan name given to long term public transport planning by the Irish government which fell from office in 2011.  The plan was dropped by the Minister for Transport Leo Varadkar in 2011 and is no longer the blueprint for transport planning in Ireland.

Route and services
The Western Rail Corridor encompasses a series of railways built by various companies throughout the late 19th century, forming a south–north line from Limerick to Sligo. Towns along the WRC include Ennis, Gort, Athenry, Tuam and Claremorris. The route crosses the Dublin–Galway line at Athenry, the Dublin–Westport/Ballina line at Claremorris and joins the Dublin–Sligo line at Collooney. The route largely parallels the corridor served by the N17 and N18 roads.

Passenger services between Claremorris and Collooney ended in 1963, with the section being closed completely in 1975 (the track was left in situ but severed at Collooney). Passenger services between Limerick and Claremorris ceased in 1976, though freight services continued for some time afterwards.

In 1988, a new passenger service started between Limerick and Ennis operating on Tuesdays and Thursdays. This was expanded to Fridays and Saturdays in February 1993 and a six-day service in May 1994. In December 2003, a new seven train a day service started between Limerick and Ennis (connecting or continuing to/from Dublin or Limerick Junction). This was subsequently upgraded to up to 9 trains per day.

Rail freight services

Freight services ran regularly on the Limerick to Claremorris section until the mid-1990s. However, with the closure of the Asahi factory near Ballina, regular freight services north of Athenry ceased in 1997. Fertiliser trains from Foynes continued to use the line as far as Athenry until 2000 and bulk cement trains from the Irish Cements Ltd Castlemungret factory near Limerick until 2001, when the line ceased to have any regular traffic. The line from Claremorris to Athenry now carries no services and is classified by Iarnród Éireann as "engineering sidings". Work on clearing the line was undertaken by Iarnród Éireann from November 2015 onwards. Works included reinstating fencing and removal of vegetation.

Debate

Arguments
The reopening of the Western Rail Corridor has raised debate in parts of Ireland, with opinion divided on the benefits of the scheme.

Arguments in favour of reopening the corridor:

Arguments in favour have generally advocated a "balanced" development of the regions vis à vis Dublin and the importance of infrastructure in so doing. The lobby group WestOnTrack has led the campaign to reopen the corridor.

 The Western Rail Corridor has been supported by all the main political parties and by the local and regional authorities of the counties through which it passes.
 The case for its reopening has been articulated in an op-ed in the Irish Times, in the Sunday Independent, by the Irish Hotels Federation, in the Irish Independent, in the Western People, and in the findings of a TG4 opinion poll.
 Environmental benefits from reduced car usage including lower air pollution and smaller carbon footprint

Arguments against reopening the Corridor:

Arguments against the reopening are based on the cost of the restoration work and the annual subsidy required post capital expenditure, and some advocate using trackbed as a cycle path or Greenway instead.

Questions were raised about its viability in an editorial in the Irish Times, by an article in the Irish Independent, by the lobby group, Platform 11, and by the Strategic Rail Review, 2003.
In 2009, the McCarthy Report recommended cancelling future sections of the project and closing the Ballina-Manulla rail line.
Critics had said that southern sections of the scheme are more viable than those closer to Sligo. The idea of a greenway on any parts of the route, which may become surplus if a railway order process was undertaken, was suggested by Minister Eamon O'Cuiv at a West on Track conference in May 2009 in response to lobbying for this idea from Enniscrone resident Brendan Quinn and his colleague John Mulligan.

Report on transport budget underspend in the West of Ireland
A mid-term evaluation of the Irish government's National Development Plan by the economic consultant company INDECON, is cited by some parties as a reason to build the Western Rail Corridor. The report stated that only half the forecast NDP transport investment in the BMW region for the period 2000–2006 was spent or committed to be spent by 2002, a shortfall of €364 million. As Transport projects have long lead times this report indicated that the relative shortfall in transport expenditure would be maintained over the course of the planning period to 2006.

Frank Dawson detailed statistics breaking out the INDECON data, who is now the Roscommon County Manager.

Reliability of the McCann Expert Working Group report
Lobbyists for the project point to the recommendations of this report commissioned by the minister for transport as evidence that the project is justified. The report stated that if the case for Mayo rail freight could be proven, it would add to the case for rebuilding Athenry-Claremorris as one section.

Frank McDonald, in an article in the Irish Times based on information released under the Freedom of Information Act, indicated that the report was rewritten to exclude any negative assessment of the viability of the project including a forecast that it would 'attract only 750 passengers per day and could require an annual subvention of up to €10 million'. Passenger numbers for the first section of the line between Ennis-Limerick were reported at a mere 600 a day in March 2008.

Criticisms of the McCann Report have included the reliance on anecdotal testimony regarding freight demand and the absence of costings for rolling stock and operating expenses.

A cost-benefit analysis report prepared by Goodbody Economic Consultants for the Department of Transport in 2006 stated that passenger numbers on the soon to be opened Ennis-Athenry section of the WRC would be in the order of 200,000, requiring an annual subvention of €2.4m, with a negative Net Present Value of -€137m. The report concluded that even a doubling of patronage would not make the project viable on cost-benefit grounds, while the regional development benefits from the re-opening were viewed as 'unlikely to be significant.'

Effect of freight
The McCann Report suggests that the Ennis Claremorris Section could divert and grow Mayo to Waterford freight traffic via the Western Rail Corridor.

Opponents argue that rail freight volumes in the country have dropped near to zero in recent years and that indirect freight routes already exist from most large towns in the region.  
As of September 2015 nine trains serve this freight route in each direction each week.

Infrastructure before development
Advocates of the project argue that key transport infrastructure should be built prior to development and may actually encourage development to take place. Land use and settlement strategies are in place in all of the counties along the route of the WRC as a result of direct initiatives by the County Development Boards and County Councils concerned. In addition the WRC is specified as a key infrastructural objective in the County Development Plans of Clare, Galway, Mayo and Sligo as well as the Regional Planning Guidelines of the West Regional Authority.

Project opponents, however, argue that the local councils are not following land use policies that would create centres of population density around the railway stations along this route, but instead are continuing to permit isolated rural housing.

A talk took place in Tuam on 22nd October 2022.

Timeline for reopening

Expert Working Group Report
An Expert Working Group, headed by Pat McCann, CEO of Jurys Doyle Hotels, reported to the Minister for Transport regarding the prospects for reopening some or all of the route. The group was set up by Minister Séamus Brennan at the urging of West-on-Track in June 2004 and delivered its report to Minister Martin Cullen in May 2005.

The report recommended the reopening of most of the Corridor in three phases and the deferral of the reopening of the northernmost section:

Phase 1: Ennis to Athenry
58 km / 36 miles (€74.7 million)

Phase 2: Athenry to Tuam
25 km / 15.5 miles (€34.7 million)

Phase 3: Tuam to Claremorris
(subject to study of rail freight demand or in conjunction with phase 2)
27 km / 17 miles (€58.9 million)

Phase 4: Claremorris to Collooney
(subject to further feasibility studies and possibly justifiable on the grounds of balanced regional development)
74.43 km / 46.25 miles (€197.4 million)

Transport 21
On 1 November 2005 the Transport 21 plan was launched committing government expenditure of €34 billion between 2006 and 2015 on road, rail and light rail projects. The Western Railway Corridor commitments under this plan were largely those recommended by the McCann Report:

 2009 – Opening of Ennis-Athenry section
 2011 – Opening of Athenry-Tuam section
 2014 – Opening of Tuam-Claremorris section

Former Minister for Transport Martin Cullen also announced the undertaking of a feasibility study into a rail link for Shannon Airport in his speech at the launch. This study, undertaken by MVA Consultants, estimated the proposed link would cost €700m, while an Iarnród Éireann manager stated that 'the costs of the construction of the rail link are out of proportion to the benefits to be gained'.

Transport 21 also stated the section of line from Claremorris to Collooney, the northern section known as Section Four in the McCann Report should be subject to protection of the alignment.

Transport 21 was shelved by the current Irish Government in May 2011. There are no plans to re-open any more sections of the Western Rail Corridor. Former Minister for Transport Leo Varadkar TD is on record as saying the Government has no plans to re-open any further sections of the Western Rail corridor.

TEN-T Transport policy
In November 2013 the European Parliament approved European TEN-T Transport policy. In the most radical overhaul of EU infrastructure policy since its inception in the 1980s, the European Parliament on 19 November 2013 gave final approval to new maps showing the nine major corridors which will act as a backbone for transportation in Europe's single market and revolutionise East–West connections. To match this level of ambition, Parliament also voted to triple EU financing for transport infrastructure.

On the island of Ireland, the only rail route corridor that is included in the TEN-T Core network is the route Cork-Dublin-Belfast. The Limerick-Athenry section of the Western Rail Corridor is included in the TEN-T Comprehensive network.

Progress of works
Following preliminary works in late 2005 and early 2006, official clearance work on the northern section of the line (Claremorris to Collooney) began on 18 September 2006. Renewal of track commenced in 2007 on the line between Ennis and Athenry was completed in 2009. After a gap of more than thirty years, train services between the cities of Galway and Limerick commenced on Tuesday 30 March 2010, on budget at a cost of €106.5m, a figure which included building new stations in Sixmilebridge and Oranmore.  The service provides five trains per day between Galway and Limerick.  It serves existing stations at Limerick, Ennis, Athenry and Galway, as well as new stations at Sixmilebridge, Gort, Ardrahan and Craughwell. The Limerick to Galway service also feeds into expanded intercity services between Limerick and Dublin and between Galway and Dublin. Iarnród Éireann planned for both routes to gain hourly services at peak and two hourly off-peak; however, recession has resulted in delay, with some services withdrawn.

The middle section of the western rail corridor, Athenry – Claremorris, has been programmed but not funded under Transport 21 while the Colooney – Claremorris northern section has not been programmed or funded bar some line clearance work in 2006. Transport 21 is no longer Irish government policy.

In comments by then Taoiseach Enda Kenny on 22 December 2014 on Midwest radio said the Western Rail corridor was "not going to happen in the foreseeable future" and said "this is not going to happen" when asked about the Western Rail Corridor.

Following those remarks, in January 2015 Kenny said at a press briefing in Lough Lannagh in Castlebar told local media in Mayo that he still sees the potential for developing freight services on the line stating, "I still see potential [on the Western Rail Corridor] from a freight point of view."

Patronage
In 2011, The Irish Examiner reported that passenger numbers were "still quite low" in 2010.

Four years after the opening of the route an online booking facility was introduced in December 2013. On 6 January 2015, Iarnród Éireann reported that following the introduction of online booking and new adult fares, passenger numbers on the Galway-Limerick railway (Western Rail Corridor) for 2014 were in excess of 220,000, including a 72.5 per cent increase in passenger journeys through the Ennis- Athenry section of the line, the largest annual growth on the rail network. The service was also being promoted through free car parking at Gort, Ardrahan and Craughwell; promotion of Taxsaver tickets, giving commuters full tax relief on the cost of monthly and annual season tickets purchased through employers and group travel promotions, including schools.

The Irish Times noted the 2015 figures as follows "Of particular note was the growth in passenger numbers on the western rail corridor, which saw a 72.5 per cent increase from 29,000 to 50,000 journeys through the Ennis-Athenry section of the line".

By 2017, the Ennis-Athenry section carried nearly 100,000 passengers.

Collooney-Claremorris section as a greenway
The idea of opening a greenway, on the Collooney-Claremorris section of the line, has been advocated by the campaign group Sligo-Mayo Greenway. This group has argued that the funding for a greenway on this section would be minimal in infrastructural terms and would not hinder the eventual reinstatement of the Railway should the funding for that ever become available. The campaigners for the greenway on this section of the track, point to the success of the Great Western Greenway, the first section of which opened in 2010.

In August 2011 this proposal was ruled out by the former Western Regional Authority but the proposal continues to be discussed. During 2013 the idea twice failed to get a seconder at Galway and Mayo Co. Councils and was also defeated (16-3) at Roscommon Co Council. The County Managers' reports in respect of the new Co Development Plans for both Galway and Mayo pointed to the strategic importance of protecting the railway infrastructure and to having proposed walking and cycling routes located elsewhere.

In July 2014 Sligo County Council passed a motion put to the council chamber by Cllr Dara Mulvey that Sligo County Council should seek funding for a feasibility study for a greenway on the route within County Sligo from Collooney to Bellaghy on the County Sligo/Mayo border.  The motion was passed without a vote by Sligo county council and is now County Council policy.

In February 2015 a new campaign group the Sligo Greenway Co-op was formed as a shareholding co-op - with shares issued at €1 each and shares sold in blocks of ten.  As of July 2015 the Sligo Greenway Co-op had 280 shareholders in County Sligo and had the support of two Sligo TDs, Tony McLoughlin and John Perry. Perry was not re-elected in 2016.

A 2014 study by the NWRA (Northern and Western Regional Assembly) of future recreational developments in the area of outdoor pursuits in Counties Galway, Mayo and Roscommon rejected the idea that the Western Rail Corridor be turned into a walking or cycling route. The "Study of Outdoor Recreation in the West" (2014) stated: "The Regional Planning Guidelines (RPGs) for the West Region 2010-2022 seek the full reinstatement of the Western Rail Corridor as a long-term strategic sustainable transport route. Greenways are not mentioned in the RPGs, though the development of suitable long-distance walking and cycling routes (subject to environmental assessment) are supported. It is not the purpose of the Regional Planning Guidelines to see such routes provided at the expense of long-term strategic infrastructure so it is critical that the goals are not hampered even in the short term particularly when other more suitable greenway options could be explored taking account of environmental, social and economic considerations".

Supporters of the greenway state that use of a greenway will protect the trackbed from adverse possession claims and will not preclude reinstatement of the disused sections of line as a working railway in the future.

Sligo to Derry
The idea for the development of a North-Western Rail Corridor is the suggested construction of a railway connecting Sligo, Bundoran, Ballyshannon, Donegal Town, Letterkenny and Derry, where it would connect with the Belfast-Derry railway line. This proposal, however, is not included in the TEN-T European Transport policy. However, a study on future rail lines commissioned by Iarnród Éireann, by consultants AECOM, in 2011 found that an extension of the Belfast-Derry railway line to Letterkenny was one point away from being regarded as a viable prospect.

See also
 Rail transport in Ireland
 History of rail transport in Ireland
 Wild Atlantic Way

References

Sources
Johnson, S. (1997). Johnson's Atlas & Gazetteer of the Railways of Ireland, Midland Publishing Ltd. .
Current timetables http://www.irishrail.ie/media/02-DublinLimerickEnnis2807131.pdf from Iarnród Éireann website
Report to the Minister for Transport from the Chairman of the Expert Working Group on the Western Rail Corridor (WRC), May 2005 from The Department of Transport

External links
West on Track

Closed railways in Ireland
Rail transport in Ireland
Proposed public transport in Ireland
Transport corridors